Hélio José Muniz Filho (1977 – 14 January 2001), better known as Helinho, was a Brazilian vigilante murderer. He was accused of killing 65 people.

He was born in Camaragibe, Pernambuco, in the Metropolitan region of Recife.

In 1997, he was sentenced to 201 years in prison in Recife, Pernambuco. On 14 January 2001, 24-year-old Hélio was stabbed in the neck and arm by three inmates at the Maxima Anibal Bruno Security Prison. He was taken to Freitas Octavian Hospital in Recife, where he succumbed to his injuries.

References 

1977 births
2001 deaths
Brazilian people convicted of murder
Brazilian serial killers
Deaths by stabbing in Brazil
Male serial killers
People from Recife
Serial killers murdered in prison custody
Vigilantes

Prisoners who died in Brazilian detention